The Institut de recherche Robert-Sauvé en santé et en sécurité du travail (IRSST) (Occupational Health and Safety Research Institute) is a private, non-profit organization known for its scientific research on the prevention of industrial accidents and occupational diseases and the rehabilitation of affected workers. It was established in Quebec in 1980.

Its board of directors is composed of an equal number of trade union and employers' representatives.  The Commission de la santé et de la sécurité du travail (CSST) provides most of the Institute's funding from the contributions it collects from employers.

IRSST carries out scientific activities in seven research fields: accidents, chemical substances and biological agents, musculoskeletal disorders, noise and vibration, protective equipment, occupational rehabilitation, safety of industrial tools, machines and processes.

IRSST has approximately 140 employees. The staff have coauthored over 5000 scientific presentations and publications since its founding. IRSST has ongoing partnerships with Institute for Work and Health funded by the government of Ontario and with the U.S. National Institute for Occupational Safety and Health (NIOSH).

See also 
  IRSST website

References 

Organizations based in Quebec